Geraint Jarman (born 1950 in Denbigh) is a Welsh musician, poet and television producer whose career dates back to the early years of Welsh popular music. He has recorded many albums as a solo artist and with his band Geraint Jarman a'r Cynganeddwyr.

Career
He also wrote "Y Brawd Houdini", one of Stevens' most popular recordings. He introduced genres such as reggae into Welsh music and released many albums as a solo artist and with his band as Geraint Jarman a'r Cynganneddwyr (Geraint Jarman and the Poets), his first album (Gobaith Mawr y Ganrif) released in 1976 by Sain. In the late 1970s he was championed by John Peel who introduced him to a wider audience through his BBC Radio 1 show.

Gruff Rhys, in the liner notes of the Welsh Rare Beat album, paid tribute to Jarman's influence, stating "Jarman helped to sever ties with Celtic folk and serve as a bridge to a new wave of post punk/post Sain Welsh language artists in the 1980s and beyond who had a less self-conscious relationship with their Welsh identity." The BBC described him as the "father of Welsh rock".

Jarman co-produced the S4C television show Fideo 9, which gave important exposure to a later generation of Welsh bands. He has also had several volumes of poetry published, including Cerbyd Cydwybod (2012, Gomer Press).

Jarman is married to actress Nia Caron, with whom he has two daughters, Hanna and Mared; Mared, the couple's youngest daughter, is living with Stargardt disease. Jarman also has a daughter, Lisa, from his first marriage to Heather Jones.

His autobiography, Twrw Jarman, was published in 2011.

Discography
Gobaith Mawr y Ganrif (1976), Sain
Tacsi i'r Tywyllwch (1977), Sain
Hen Wlad Fy Nhadau (1978), Sain
Gwesty Cymru (1979), Sain
Fflamau'r Ddraig (1980), Sain
Diwrnod i'r Brenin (1981), Sain
Macsen (1983), Sain
Enka (1985), Sain
Taith y Carcharorion (1986), Sain - Geraint Jarman & Maffia Mr Huws
Rhiniog (1992), Ankstmusic
Y Ceubal Y Crossbar A'r Quango (1994), Ankstmusic
Eilydd Na Ddefnyddiwyd / Sub Not Used (1998), Sain
Môrladron (2002), Sain
Pirates (2002)
Brecwast Astronot (2011), Ankstmusic
Dwyn yr Hogyn Nol (2014)
Cariad Cwantwm (2018)

Compilations
Goreuon Geraint Jarman A'r Cynganeddwyr - Cyfrol 1 (1991), Sain
Atgof fel angor (2008), Sain - 15CD retrospective

References

External links
Jarman's page on Sain label site
Artist page on Swn Festival website
2015 interview with WalesOnline

Living people
Date of birth missing (living people)
Musicians from Cardiff
Welsh guitarists
Welsh male singers
Welsh poets
Welsh-language singers
Welsh-speaking musicians
1950 births